Myxodagnus belone, the dartfish, is a species of sand stargazer native to the waters around the Bahamas and Puerto Rico where they can be found on sandy bottoms from near the surface to  in depth.  This species can reach a maximum length of  SL.

References

belone
Fish described in 1968